Finland national hockey team may refer to:

 Finland men's national field hockey team
 Finland men's national ice hockey team
 Finland men's national junior ice hockey team
 Finland men's national under-18 ice hockey team
 Finland women's national ice hockey team
 Finland women's national under-18 ice hockey team
 Finland men's national inline hockey team
 Finland women's national inline hockey team